Revolutionary Communist Group is the name of several political parties:

 Revolutionary Communist Group (Algeria)
 Revolutionary Communist Group of Colombia
 Revolutionary Communist Group (Italy)
 Revolutionary Communist Group (Lebanon)
 Revolutionary Communist Group (Philippines)
 Revolutionary Communist Group (UK)

See also
 Internationalist Revolutionary Communist Group

Political party disambiguation pages